Fleming is a town in Saskatchewan, Canada. Per the 2021 census, with a population of 70 inhabitants, Fleming was the smallest official town in Saskatchewan by population. It is bordered primarily by the Rural Municipality of Moosomin No. 121, but also by the Rural Municipality of Maryfield No. 91.

Demographics 

See also 

 List of communities in Saskatchewan
 List of towns in Saskatchewan

References

Towns in Saskatchewan
Moosomin No. 121, Saskatchewan
Division No. 5, Saskatchewan